The Case of Becky is a 1921 American silent drama film based on a successful 1912 play written by David Belasco and Edward J. Locke, The Case of Becky.<ref>[http://lcweb2.loc.gov/diglib/ihas/loc.mbrs.sfdb.4181/default.html The Library of Congress American Silent Film Feature Survival Catalog: The Case of Becky" 1921 version]</ref> Belasco also produced the play, which starred his muse, Frances Starr.

The film was produced by Realart Pictures, directed by Chester M. Franklin, written by J. Clarkson Miller and released through Paramount Pictures. George J. Folsey was the cinematographer.Progressive Silent Film List: The Case of Becky at silentera.com

The play was filmed earlier (in 1915) in a version starring Blanche Sweet, which emphasized the horror elements.

Montagu Love went on to star in several other silent horror films, The Haunted House (1929) and The Cat Creeps'' (1930).

Plot
Dorothy Stone (Binney) is the step-daughter of barn-storming hypnotist Professor Balzamo (Love), who has used her as his subject since childhood. During his hypnosis act, she becomes her evil alter ego named Becky. Her mother's deathbed warning leads Dorothy to leave the hypnotist and she finds shelter in a small town with Mrs. Arnold (Jennings) and her son John (Hunter), who falls in love with her. When he gives her an engagement ring, the flashing stone induces a reversion to her evil personality. The famous psychologist Dr. Emerson (McCormack) diagnoses her case correctly and attempts a cure. The chance visit by the hypnotist results in a situation where Dorothy is permanently cured and learns that she is actually the daughter of the physician. After Balzamo commits suicide, there is a happy ending.

Cast
Constance Binney as Dorothy Stone
Glenn Hunter as John Arnold
Frank McCormack as Dr. Emerson
Montagu Love as Professor Balzamo
Margaret Seddon as Mrs. Emerson
Jane Jennings as Mrs. Arnold

Preservation status
A copy is held at UCLA Film and Television Archive. This film was formerly thought to be lost.

References

External links

Lantern slide(Wayback Machine)

1921 films
American silent feature films
American films based on plays
1920s rediscovered films
1921 drama films
Silent American drama films
Films directed by Chester Franklin
American black-and-white films
Remakes of American films
Rediscovered American films
1920s American films